Udoh Etop David (born 11 November 1999) is a Nigerian footballer.

References

External links
 

1999 births
Living people
Nigerian footballers
Nigerian expatriate footballers
Association football midfielders
FC Lori players
JS Kairouan players
Arar FC players
Armenian Premier League players
Tunisian Ligue Professionnelle 1 players
Saudi First Division League players
Expatriate footballers in Armenia
Expatriate footballers in Tunisia
Expatriate footballers in Saudi Arabia
Nigerian expatriate sportspeople in Armenia
Nigerian expatriate sportspeople in Tunisia
Nigerian expatriate sportspeople in Saudi Arabia